The H and S Railroad  was a shortline railroad operating  of track from Dothan to Taylor, Alabama. Upon its start in 1992 the railroad was a Gulf & Ohio subsidiary. The railroad was purchased by Genesee & Wyoming Railroad in 2006 and was combined with a neighboring property, the Chattahoochee and Gulf Railroad, to form the Chattahoochee Bay Railroad.

History

On April 29, 1992  of the Hartford & Slocomb was abandoned between Taylor and Hartford. The remainder was sold by the Itel Corporation to Gulf & Ohio subsidiary H and S Railroad. Primary traffic consisted of railcars moving to and from a repair facility near Taylor.

The railroad remained relatively unchanged until August 30, 2006 when it was sold to Genesee & Wyoming. Operations were merged with the Chattahoochee and Gulf Railroad and are operated as a single railroad.

References

Defunct Alabama railroads
Gulf and Ohio Railways